The Courier is a 2013 American direct-to-video action film directed by Hany Abu-Assad and produced by Michael Arata and Jeffrey Dean Morgan, starring Jeffrey Dean Morgan as a courier who specializes in delivering high-risk packages.

Plot
"The Courier" lives in a derelict flat where he has adopted a mouse as his pet. When he visits his old friend Stitch at his boxing gym, he is contacted by a stranger who tasks him up with delivering a suitcase to a man known as "Evil Sivle". The stranger does not know where Sivle is and explains  that the finding of this person is the actual task. It is made unequivocally clear that the courier is at no liberty to refuse this mission and shall expect his own death should he fail. After the client threatens their loved ones, Stitch sends his family into hiding.  The courier starts by hacking into the FBI database. When he needs a pilot, Stitch assigns him his adopted daughter, Anna. Although skeptical of her skill, the courier comes to respect her.

The courier's attempts to find Sivle only lead to killings. After another associate of Sivle's has been killed right under his eyes, the police arrest the courier. To his surprise, he is soon released and finds out that his unrequested client works for the FBI. The courier visits him at home and learns that the suitcase is from Russia and that the FBI considers it the only chance to get to Evil Sivle, who is an infamous assassin. The FBI agent also points out that Evil Sivle is about to turn tables with the courier.   Sivle orders a duo of assassins to kill Stitch and Anna.

The assassins kill Stitch. As the courier and Anna mourn his loss, the assassins attack them. The courier bugs the assassins. The FBI agent gets to Anna and convinces her to leak information about the courier's progress on the promise that the FBI can help fix the mess. When the courier finds out, he becomes angry and leaves her. Meanwhile when the assassins found out the bug , they fed the courier with disinformation that leads to his capture and eventual torture. When they give him a rest, he escapes and kills them. Before dying, one reveals that Sivle is in a casino in Las Vegas. There, the courier realizes that the name Evil Sivle is "Elvis Live" backward. When he finally confronts Evil Sivle, an Elvis impersonator at a Las Vegas club, Sivle reveals the truth: the courier is actually Sivle, and the man he has found is Maxwell, his old partner who told Sivle how he (Maxwell) killed everyone but Sivle and his son, and Sivle suffered amnesia as a result of an injury. After Maxwell taunts Sivle about the death of his wife, Sivle kills Maxwell, leaving him without any way to find his son.

Cast
 Jeffrey Dean Morgan as "The Courier"/ Sivle
 Mickey Rourke as Maxwell
 Josie Ho as Anna
 Til Schweiger as Agent Lispy
 Lili Taylor as Mrs Capo
 Miguel Ferrer as Mr Capo
 Mark Margolis as Stitch
 Alec Rayme as The Kidnapper

Reception
Robert Kolarik of the San Antonio Express-News wrote that the film start off well but loses its way once it starts to fill in the courier's back story.  Gabe Toro of Indiewire rated it D+ and wrote that the film "almost seems embarrassed by its content".  Tyler Foster of DVD Talk rated it 1.5/5 stars and wrote, "The Courier is a tired thriller, filled with tired actors playing tired characters, wrapped up in a tired story."  Gordon Sullivan of DVD Verdict called it "a thoroughly average B-action-thriller" of interest only to Morgan's fans.

References

External links
 
 
 
 
 

2012 films
2012 action thriller films
American action thriller films
2010s English-language films
Films directed by Hany Abu-Assad
2010s American films